Cho Min-gyu (born 8 August 1988) is a South Korean professional golfer.

Cho plays on the Japan Golf Tour where he has won twice.

Professional wins (2)

Japan Golf Tour wins (2)

Japan Golf Tour playoff record (0–1)

Playoff record
Asian Tour playoff record (0–1)

Results in major championships

CUT = missed the half-way cut

External links

South Korean male golfers
Japan Golf Tour golfers
1988 births
Living people